Jay Fung Wan-him (Chinese:馮允謙, born 22 February 1988) is a Hong Kong-Canadian singer-songwriter. He won the 1st runner up in The Voice 3. Born in Hong Kong and raised in Edmonton, Canada, his style of singing is deeply influenced by Western pop music. He signed a contract with Music Plus Label at 2012 and debuted with the song "Starting From Today"(今天開始). In 2018, he joined Media Asia Music.

Early life and education 
Fung was born on 22 February 1988 in British Hong Kong. He emigrated to Edmonton, Canada with his family when he was one-and-a-half years old. He graduated from the University of Alberta Marketing.

Career 

Fung began learning the guitar at the age of 13. In 2011, Fung competed in the 3rd season of The Voice, placing as the final runner-up. He officially joined Music Plus Label, part of Imperial Entertainment Group, in 2012. On 12 November 2012, he released his first album, Starting From Today.

Discography 
Album
 Brand New Start (2012)
 Tu Es Digne D'amour (2013)
 The In-Between (2014)
 Odyssey (2015)
 Coexistence (2016)
 Detour (2020)
 Awaken (2020)
 Life / Line (2021)
 LOVE & LOSS (2022)
Single
 Bring Out Ya Fire (2023)

Concerts

Filmography

Films

Television Shows

MV Appearance (Actor)

Songwriting Works For Other Singers
As Composer:
"DWBF" by Ian Chan (2021) 
"Overruled" by MC Cheung (2021)
"You Made My Day" by Ansonbean (2021)
"Long D" by Jace Chan (2022)
"The One For U" by MC Cheung (2023)

Awards and nominations

References

External links 
 Jay Fung's YouTube Channel
 
 

1988 births
Living people
Hong Kong male singers
Canadian people of Chinese descent
The Voice (franchise) contestants
Cantopop singer-songwriters
Canadian expatriates in Hong Kong
English-language singers from Hong Kong
Cantopop singers
21st-century Hong Kong male singers
Media Asia Music Artists